Jacques Bridaine (21 March 1701, in Chusclan – 22 December 1767, in Roquemaure) was a French Roman Catholic preacher.

Biography
Having completed his studies at the Jesuit college of Avignon he entered the Sulpician Seminary of the Royal Missions of St. Charles of the Cross. Soon after his ordination to the priesthood in 1725, he joined the Missions Royales, organized to bring back to the Catholíc faith the Protestants of France. For over forty years he visited as a missionary preacher almost every town of central and southern France.  When only in minor orders, he was assigned as Lenten preacher in the Church of Aigues-Mortes.

It was at Aigues-Mortes where his extreme youth provoked the derision of the people and when Ash Wednesday arrived, the church was empty. Undismayed, he put on his surplice and went out in the principal streets, ringing a bell, and inviting the people to hear him. He succeeded in filling the church with congregants who came out of curiosity but when he began in a most unusual fashion by singing a canticle about death the congregation burst out in loud laughter; whereupon he denounced the congregation. He was characteristically sensational. He wrote little and gave way to the inspiration of the moment and as a consequence his utterances at times were an incoherent jumble of incongruous figures and ideas, which clashed with each other and were often even grotesque.

It was Cardinal Maury who called attention to his exordium in the sermon on Eternity which was said to be improvised. Father Cahour, S.J., inserted it in his Chefs-d'Oeuvre d'éloquence, and Maury who wrote it from memory declared that it was worthy of Bossuet or Demosthenes. It was proclaimed at St. Sulpice before an audience of dignitaries. Nevertheless, Bridaine denounced the assembly as sinners, and bade them to tremble before him, "Today I hold your condemnation in my hand." Opinions were divided about the oratory; some finding a self-consciousness in it which was unapostolic.

He was renowned for having a sonorous and penetrating voice that could easily be heard by an audience of ten thousand people. He tended towards great theatrics to engage his audience. A supreme instance of these "methods" as he called them, and which he always insisted upon being carried out, is narrated by Madame Necker in the Nouveaux Mélanges (I, 138). He had just delivered a stirring discourse when addressing himself to the great procession which had followed him he said: "I am now going to bring you home" and he led them to the grave-yard.

In the course of his life he preached two hundred and fifty-six missions, traveling to almost every town of France in the performance of his work. Pope Benedict XIV gave him permission to preach anywhere in Christendom. Medals were struck in his honor, and the most distinguished prelates showed him the greatest reverence and affection. His Cantiques Spirituels passed through forty-seven editions, in use in most French churches. He has also left five volumes of sermons (ed. Avignon, 1823; Paris, 1861). The Protestants of France are said to have been particularly friendly to him, because of the many good offices he performed in their regard. For fourteen years he followed the spiritual guidance of a missionary like himself named Mahistre. In 1742 Cardinal Fleury proposed to establish a missionary congregation for all France under the direction of Bridaine, but the death of the cardinal caused the project to fall through.

In Paris, in 1744, his sermons created a deep impression. France was wild with excitement about him. His appeals were so powerful that in a mission which he preached at Chalon-sur-Saône in 1745 there were restitutions to the amount of 100,000 francs. His reputation as an orator was so great that even Massillon was unwilling to preach in his presence. In the course of his missions he established what he called "peace tribunals", courts composed of some of his associate missionaries, a number of irreproachable laymen, and the parish priest. To these courts all disputes were submitted and the decisions were accepted as final. His life was written by the Abbé Carron. The book was frequently translated into English, the first edition published in 1831.

Notes

References
 This work in turn cites:
Abbé G. Carron, (1803) Le Modèle des prêtres

External links
 

1701 births
1767 deaths
French Roman Catholic missionaries
Roman Catholic missionaries in France